A shaker is a device used in vibration testing to excite the structure, either for endurance testing or modal testing.

References
Tongue, Benson, Principles of Vibration, Oxford University Press, 2001, 
Inman, Daniel J., Engineering Vibration, Prentice Hall, 2001, 
Rao, Singiresu, Mechanical Vibrations, Addison Wesley, 1990, 
Thompson, W.T., Theory of Vibrations, Nelson Thornes Ltd, 1996, 
Hartog, Den, Mechanical Vibrations, Dover Publications, 1985,

See also
 Vibration

Tests